Edy Thomi (born 9 June 1929) was a Swiss gymnast. He competed in eight events at the 1960 Summer Olympics.

References

External links
 

1929 births
Possibly living people
Swiss male artistic gymnasts
Olympic gymnasts of Switzerland
Gymnasts at the 1960 Summer Olympics
People from Brig-Glis
Sportspeople from Valais
20th-century Swiss people